The King's Law or Lex Regia (also called the Danish Royal Law of 1665) was the absolutist constitution of Denmark and Norway from 1665 until 1849 and 1814, respectively. It established complete hereditary (agnatic-cognatic primogeniture) and absolute monarchy and formalized the king's absolute power, and is regarded the most sovereign form of all the European expressions of absolutism. Danish professor in legal history of the University of Copenhagen, Jens Chr. V. Johansen, asserts that with Europe's least circumscribed form of absolutism, Denmark "may be considered the most absolute of all the absolute European monarchies". It is the only formal constitution of any absolute monarchy, and has therefore been the subject of considerable historical and academic attention.

The King's Law comprises 40 articles and is divided into seven main chapters. Articles 1 to 7 determine the royal absolute power, and the following articles contain rules on the king's authority and guardianship, on the king's accession and anointment, on the indivisibility of the kingdoms, on princes and princesses, on the king's duty to maintain absolute monarchy, and on the succession.

In Denmark the King's Law was replaced in 1849 by the Constitution of the Kingdom of Denmark (June constitution), although two Articles of the King's Law is still applicable; firstly Article 21, requiring the king's permission for the departure and marriage of princes and princesses. And secondly Article 25, according to it, princes and princesses of the blood can only be criminally prosecuted on the king's orders.

The King's Law was read aloud during the king's coronation and anointment, but not published until 1709. Two original copies are currently accessible to the public; one at the Danish National Archives, and one at Rosenborg Castle (both in Copenhagen). The law at Rosenborg is Queen Margrethe II's private and is stored in the treasury vault among the Danish Crown Regalia.

Background 

After Denmark's catastrophic defeat to Sweden in the Dano-Swedish War (part of the Second Northern War) in 1660, an assembly of the estates of the realm was summoned to Copenhagen by king Frederik III, above all in order to reorganize the kingdom's finances. The burghers especially felt that the nobility had not lived up to its responsibilities (securing the army and defence of the kingdom), which were the justification for its privileges. In this tense situation, negotiations for various reforms went forward until the beginning of October, but in vain. On 11 October, the king ordered the city gates of Copenhagen to be closed so that no one could leave without the permission of the king and the mayor. Under intense pressure from the burghers of Copenhagen and through the threat that force might be employed against the Danish nobility, the estates were persuaded to "agree" to transfer absolute power to the crown, Frederik III.

Completion 
This new constitution (lex fundamentalis) for Denmark-Norway, which in 40 Articles gave the king absolute power, all the rights of the sovereign and fixed the rules of succession, was influenced by contemporary European political thinking, especially by Jean Bodin and Henning Arnisaeus.

When the constitutional discussions were completed, Schumacher rewrote the new King's Law in duplicate. One was placed in the Privy Council's Archives, i.e. in the State Archives (afterwards the Danish National Archives), another at Rosenborg Castle together with the state crowns (Christian IV's and Christian V's) and the other crown regalia. Moreover, the fact that Schumacher had a very large part of the credit for the law is evident from the fact that he countersigned it.

Text and publication 
The King's Law was published during the reign of Frederick IV, engraved throughout, the royal copy bound in red velvet elaborately embroidered in gold and silver thread with the king's monogram in the centre.

Essentially, the King's Law stated that the King was to be 'revered and considered the most perfect and supreme person on the Earth by all his subjects, standing above all human laws and having no judge above his person, [...] except God alone'. It effectuated the divine right of kings.

A copy of the King's Law published by the Royal Danish Library, may be found at here.

Summary of the King's Law 
The law dictated the three primary duties of the Danish absolute monarch:

 To worship God, according to the Augsburg Confession (lutheranism).
 To keep the kingdoms (Denmark-Norway) undivided.
 To ensure that the King's power did not deteriorate.

In exchange, the king was given unrestricted rights and was, according to the constitution, responsible only to God. For example, he had the unrestrained legislative and executive power, he could declare war and make peace, and was the head of the church.

Repealing 
In the epilogue to the June Constitution of 1849, the King's Law was repealed except for Articles 27 to 40 (on the succession) and Articles 21 and 25 (concerning the royal princes and princesses). The King's law's provisions on the succession were repealed by the Act of Succession of 1953. On the other hand, the provisions of Article 25 of the King's Law concerning, inter alia, the legal immunity of royal princes and princesses are still applicable. Likewise, the provisions of Article 21 concerning the king's permission for royal marriages and travels, are still applicable.

Although the King's Law was repealed, many of the king's prerogatives of the Danish Constitution have a precursor in the King's Law. Thus, several of the prerogatives are directly to be found in the King's Law.

Christian VII 

Christian VII of Denmark ascended the Danish throne in 1766 as absolute monarch. Throughout his reign he suffered from various physiological illnesses including schizophrenia, which made him insane. As the King's Law had no physical or mental incapacity provisions, Christian could not officially be considered insane, as such a view would have constituted lèse-majesté. As a result, he could not be legally dismissed or forced to abdicate, nor could a regency be enacted. During the mental illness attacks of Christian's first cousin, George III of Great Britain, Britain's parliamentary system was not met with a similar problem. Christian married Caroline Matilda of Great Britain, George's sister, in 1766.

References

External Links
Text of Rex Legia in Danish. http://thomasthorsen.dk/dk-lr-1655.html

Law of Denmark
17th century in Danish law
Constitution of Denmark
Succession acts
Danish monarchy
1665 establishments in Europe
1665 in Denmark